The 2016 Baltimore Orioles season  was the 116th season in franchise history, the 63rd in Baltimore, and the 25th at Oriole Park at Camden Yards. They improved on their 2015 record of 81–81, finishing 89–73. and advanced to the playoffs on the last day of the season, October 2, where they lost to the Blue Jays in the American League Wild Card Game 5–2 in 11 innings; this was the Orioles' third postseason appearance in five years.

Right fielder Mark Trumbo won the MLB and American League home run championships with 47; 2016 was the fourth consecutive year in which an Oriole won the home run crown following Chris Davis in 2013, Nelson Cruz in 2014 and Davis again in 2015. Closer Zach Britton recorded a perfect 47 saves in 47 opportunities; Britton set an all-time record of 43 consecutive appearances without allowing an earned run. Britton's 0.54 ERA was the lowest ever recorded by a pitcher with at least 50 innings pitched. This season remains (As of 2022) the Orioles most recent playoff appearance, and it would be their last winning season until 2022.

Offseason
Oct 20: Claimed RHP Vance Worley off waivers from Pittsburgh Pirates.
Nov 2: C Matt Wieters, 1B Chris Davis, OF Gerardo Parra, 1B Steve Pearce, LHP Wei-yin Chen and RHP Darren O'Day elected free agency.
Nov 2: RHP Dylan Bundy activated from 60-day disabled list.
Nov 6: Selected contract of LHP Chris Jones from AAA Norfolk Tides.
Nov 13: Re-signed free agent C Matt Wieters (accepted qualifying offer).
Nov 20: Selected the contracts of RHP Parker Bridwell, RHP Andrew Triggs and LHP Chris Lee from AA Bowie Baysox.
Nov 25: Acquired OF L. J. Hoes from Houston Astros for cash.
Dec 2: Traded C Steve Clevenger to Seattle Mariners for OF/1B Mark Trumbo and LHP C. J. Riefenhauser.
Dec 2: Acquired C Francisco Peña from Kansas City Royals for cash.
Dec 2: RHP Steve Johnson and LF David Lough elected free agency.
Dec 3: SS Paul Janish elected free agency.
Dec 10: Drafted OF Joey Rickard from Tampa Bay Rays under Rule 5; designated OF Junior Lake for assignment.
Dec 14: Re-signed free agent RHP Darren O'Day; designated 2B Rey Navarro for assignment.
Dec 18: Toronto Blue Jays claimed RF Junior Lake off waivers.
Dec 23: Los Angeles Angels claimed 2B Rey Navarro off waivers.
Dec 23: Signed free agent OF Hyun-soo Kim.
Jan 1: Signed SS Paul Janish to a minor-league contract.
Jan 8: Claimed 1B Joey Terdoslavich off waivers from Atlanta Braves.
Jan 16: Re-signed free agent 1B Chris Davis; 1B Joey Terdoslavich designated for assignment.
Jan 26: Acquired OF/1B Efren Navarro from Los Angeles Angels for cash; designated OF L. J. Hoes for assignment.
Jan 28: Outrightred OF Joey Terdoslavich to AAA Norfolk Tides.
Feb 4: Outrighted OF L. J. Hoes to AAA Norfolk Tides.
Feb 4: Acquired RHP Odrisamer Despaigne from San Diego Padres for RHP Jean Cosme; designated LHP C. J. Riefenhauser for assignment.
Feb 25: Signed free agent RHP Yovani Gallardo; designated OF/1B Efren Navarro for assignment.

Regular season

Transactions

Contracts
April 7: 	St. Louis Cardinals traded LHP Jayson Aquino to Baltimore Orioles for cash.
April 15: Claimed RHP Scott McGough off waivers from Miami Marlins.
April 18: Traded LF Alfredo Marte to Philadelphia Phillies for player TBD.
April 25: Claimed RHP David Hale off waivers from Colorado Rockies.

May 7: Contract of SS Paul Janish selected from AAA Norfolk.
May 9: RHP Scott McGough sent outright to AAA Norfolk.
May 16: Toronto Blue Jays claimed DH Jimmy Paredes off waivers from Baltimore Orioles.
May 23:Baltimore Orioles traded LHP Brian Matusz to Atlanta Braves for RHP Brandon Barker and LHP Trevor Belicek.
May 24: Cincinnati Reds traded RHP Franderlin Romero to Baltimore Orioles for Future Considerations; Contract of LHP Ashur Tolliver selected from AA Bowie.
May 25: Baltimore Orioles signed free agent LHP Brian Duensing to a minor league contract.

June 2: Contract of LHP Brian Duensing selected from AAA Norfolk; Baltimore Orioles signed free agents LHP Hector Jimenez and RHP Wally Vrolijk to a minor league contracts.
June 21: SS Paul Janish sent outright to AAA Norfolk.
June 30: Contract of RHP Chaz Roe selected from AAA Norfolk. 
June 31: Contract of RHP Sidney Ponson selected from AAA Norfolk.

July 3: Contract of LHP Ariel Miranda selected from AAA Norfolk.
July 12: Contract of LHP Donnie Hart selected from AA Bowie.
July 19: Contract of OF Julio Borbón selected from AA Bowie.
July 28: OF Henry Urruita sent outright to AA Bowie.
July 29: OF Julio Bourbon sent outright to AA Bowie; signed free agent RHP Logan Ondrusek.
July 31: Baltimore Orioles traded LHP Ariel Miranda to Seattle Mariners for LHP Wade Miley.

August 1: Baltimore Orioles traded C Jonah Heim to Tampa Bay Rays for 2B Steve Pearce.
August 2: Baltimore Orioles activated Steve Pearce & LHP Wade Miley.
August 7: Atlanta Braves claim RHP Chaz Roe off waivers from Baltimore Orioles.
August 27: Contract of CF Julio Borbon selected from AA Bowie.
August 28: Baltimore Orioles signed free agent RHP Tommy Hunter.
August 30: CF Julio Borbon and RHP Logan Ondrusek sent outright to AA Bowie.
August 31: Pittsburgh Pirates traded LHP Kyle Lobstein to Baltimore Orioles for LHP Zach Phillips; Claimed CF Drew Stubbs off waivers from Texas Rangers.

September 3: LHP Kyle Lobstein sent outright to AAA Norfolk.
September 15: Miami Marlins claimed Odrisamer Despaigne off waivers from Baltimore Orioles; Contract of SS Paul Janish selected from AAA Norfolk.
September 18: Contract of 1B Trey Mancini selected from AAA Norfolk.

October 7: LHP Jed Bradley claimed off waivers from the Atlanta Braves.
October 13: SS Paul Janish sent outright to AAA Norfolk.

Callups & optional assignments
April 1: C Francisco Pena optioned to AAA Norfolk.
April 7: LHP Jayson Aquino optioned to AA Bowie.
April 15: RHP Scott McGough optioned to AAA Norfolk.
April 25: RHP David Hale and IF Ryan Flaherty optioned to AAA Norfolk.

May 3: IF Ryan Flaherty recalled from AAA Norfolk.
May 7: RHP Scott McGough designated for assignment; LHP T.J. McFarland optioned to AAA Norfolk; LHP T.J. McFarland recalled from AAA Norfolk.
May 8: LHP T.J. McFarland optioned to AAA Norfolk.
May 31: C Francisco Pena recalled from AAA Norfolk.

June 1: LHP T.J. McFarland recalled from AAA Norfolk; LHP Ashur Tolliver optioned to AAA Norfolk.
June 2: RHP Mike Wright optioned to AAA Norfolk.
June 3: RHP Mike Wright recalled from AAA Norfolk.
June 14: RHP Odrisamer Despaigne recalled from AAA Norfolk.
June 18: LHP T.J. McFarland and RHP Mike Wright optioned to AAA Norfolk.
June 21: RHP Oliver Drake recalled from AAA Norfolk.
June 22: LHP Ashur Tolliver recalled from AAA Norfolk.
June 25: LHP T.J. McFarland recalled from AAA Norfolk.
June 26: LHP T.J. McFarland optioned to AAA Norfolk.
June 27: LHP Ashur Tolliver optioned to AAA Norfolk.
June 28: LHP T.J. McFarland recalled from AAA Norfolk.
June 30: RHP Oliver Drake and C Francisco Pena optioned to AAA Norfolk.

July 3: RHP Tyler Wilson optioned to AAA Norfolk.
July 4: LHP Ariel Miranda optioned to AAA Norfolk; RF Dariel ALvarez recalled from AAA Norfolk; LHP Jayson Aquino recalled from AA Bowie.
July 7: RF Dariel ALvarez optioned to AAA Norfolk; LHP Jayson Aquino optioned to AA Bowie.
July 8: RHP Mike Wright recalled from AAA Norfolk.
July 9: RHP Mike Wright optioned to AAA Norfolk; RHP Jason Garcia recalled from AA Bowie.
July 11: RHP Jason Garcia optioned to AA Bowie.
July 19: OF Henry Urrutia designated for assignment.
July 22: RF Dariel ALvarez recalled from AAA Norfolk.
July 23: RHP Tyler Wilson recalled from AAA Norfolk.
July 24: LHP Donnie Hart optioned to AA Bowie.
July 26: RF Dariel ALvarez optioned to AAA Norfolk; CF Julio Bourbon designated for assignment.
July 29: RHP Chaz Roe designated for assignment.

August 2: RHP Odrisamer Despaigne & RHP Tyler Wilson optioned to AAA Norfolk.
August 12: RHP Logan Ondrusek optioned to AA Bowie; LHP Donnie Hart recalled from AA Bowie.
August 13: RHP Tyler Wilson recalled from AAA Norfolk.
August 20: RHP Tyler Wilson optioned to AAA Norfolk; C Francisco Pena & RHP Odrisamer Despaigne recalled from AAA Norfolk.
August 21: RHP Parker Bridwell recalled from AAA Norfolk; RHP Odrisamer Despaigne optioned to AAA Norfolk.
August 22: C Caleb Joseph optioned to AAA Norfolk.
August 24: RHP Mike Wright recalled from AAA Norfolk.
August 25: RHP Parker Bridwell optioned to AAA Norfolk; RHP Logan Ondrusek recalled from AA Bowie.
August 26: RHP Logan Ondrusek designated for assignment.
August 27: RHP Mike Wright optioned to AAA Norfolk.
August 28: LHP T.J. McFarland and CF Julio Borbon designated for assignment; RHP Oliver Drake recalled from AAA Norfolk.
August 29: LHP T.J. McFarland optioned to AAA Norfolk.
August 31: LHP Ashur Tolliver designated for assignment.

September 2: CF Michael Bourn and CF Drew Stubbs activated; C Caleb Joseph, LHP Jayson Aquino, and RHP Tyler Wilson recalled from AAA Norfolk.
September 5:  RHP Odrisamer Despaigne designated for assignment.
September 15: RHP Mike Wright recalled from AAA Norfolk; LHP Chris Lee recalled from AA Bowie.

October 3: RF Dariel Alvarez, RHP Parker Bridwell, LF Christian Walker, and LHP T.J. McFarland recalled from AAA Norfolk; RHP Jason Garcia recalled from AA Bowie.
October 4: SS Paul Janish, C Francisco Pena, RF Dariel Alvarez, LF Christian Walker, LHP Wade Miley, RHP Vance Worley, RHP Tyler Wilson, RHP Mike Wright, RHP Kevin Gausman, LHP T.J. McFarland, RHP Parker Bridwell, RHP Jason Garcia, RHP Yovani Gallardo, LHP Jayson Aquino, and RHP Oliver Drake reassigned to the minor leagues.
October 5: SS Paul Janish, C Francisco Pena, RF Dariel Alvarez, LF Christian Walker, LHP Wade Miley, RHP Vance Worley, RHP Tyler Wilson, RHP Mike Wright, RHP Kevin Gausman, LHP T.J. McFarland, RHP Parker Bridwell, RHP Jason Garcia, RHP Yovani Gallardo, LHP Jayson Aquino, and RHP Oliver Drake activated.
October 7: SS Paul Janish designated for assignment.

Injuries etc.
April 3: LHP Brian Matusz (left intercostal strain), RHP Kevin Gausman (right shoulder strain), and DH Jimmy Paredes (left wrist sprain) placed on 15-day disabled list, retroactive to March 25.
April 23: RHP Yovani Gallardo (tendinitis) placed on 15-day disabled list; LHP Brian Matusz activated from 15-day disabled list.
April 25: RHP Kevin Gausman activated from 15-day disabled list.

May 3: IF JJ Hardy (left foot fracture) placed on 15-day disabled list, retroactive to May 2.
May 31: C Caleb Joseph (testicular injury) placed on 15-day disabled list.

June 3: RHP Darren O'Day (right hamstring strain) placed on 15-day disabled list.
June 14: RHP Vance Worley (right groin strain) placed on the 15-day disabled list, retroactive to June 13.
June 18: SS J.J. Hardy and RHP Yovani Gallardo activated from 15-day disabled list.
June 19: Roster status of 3B Manny Machado changed (suspension).
June 22: LHP Brian Duensing (left elbow inflammation) placed in 15-day disabled list, retroactive to June 20.
June 24: 3B Manny Machado activated (suspension).
June 30: RHP Vance Worley and C Caleb Joseph activated from 15-day disabled list; LHP T.J. McFarland (left knee inflammation) placed on the 15-day disabled list.

July 3: LHP Brian Duensing (left elbow inflammation) transferred from 15-day disabled list to 60-day disabled list.
July 4: DH Pedro Alvarez placed on the bereavement list.
July 7: DH Pedro Alvarez activated from the bereavement list.
July 19: OF Hyun Soo Kim (right hamstring strain) placed on the 15-day disabled list, retroactive to July 11.
July 22: LF Joey Rickard (right thumb ligament injury) placed on the 15-day disabled list, retroactive to July 21, 2016.
July 23: RHP Ubaldo Jiménez placed on the paternity list.
July 24: RHP Darren O'Day activated from 15-day disabled list.
July 26: OF Hyun Soo Kim activated from 15-day disabled list; RHP Ubaldo Jiménez activated from the paternity list .

August 13: RHP Darren O'Day (right shoulder rotator cuff strain) placed on 15-day disabled list, retroactive to August 12.
August 20: C Matt Weiters placed on the paternity list.
August 22: C Matt Weiters activated from the paternity list.
August 24: RHP Chris Tillman (right shoulder bursitis) placed on 15-day disabled list, retroactive to August 21.
August 26: LHP T.J. McFarland activated from 15-day disabled list.
August 31: LF Joey Rickard (right thumb ligament injury) transferred from 15-day disabled list to 60-day disabled list.

September 5: LHP Brian Duensing activated from the 60-day disabled list.
September 11: RHP Chris Tillman activated from the 15-day disabled list.
September 15: LHP Chris Lee (left shoulder strain) placed on 60-day disabled list.
September 18: RHP Darren O'Day activated from the 15-day disabled list; 1B Steve Pearce (right flexor mass strain) placed on 60-day disabled list.
September 27: LHP Wade Miley placed on the paternity list.
September 30: LHP Wade Miley activated from the paternity list.

Season highlights
The Orioles started the season 7–0, the best start in team history.
The Orioles set the Major League record for most home runs hit by a team for the month of June with 56, breaking the previous record of 55 set by the 1996 Oakland Athletics.
The Orioles tied the Major League record for most home runs hit by a team for the month of August with 55.
The Orioles became the only team in Major League history to hit 55+ home runs in two separate months.
Hit 250+ home runs for the 2nd time in franchise history (1996), becoming the first franchise to hit at least 250 home runs in a season twice.
First team since 1947-1950 Pittsburgh Pirates to have the Major League home run leader for four consecutive seasons.
First AL team to have three different consecutive Major League home run leaders.
Mark Trumbo led the Majors with 47 home runs.
Zach Britton led the AL with 47 saves.

Season standings

American League East

American League Wild Card

Record vs. Opponents

Game log

|- bgcolor=#bfb
| 1 || April 4 || Twins || 3–2 || Britton (1–0) || Jepsen (0–1) || — || 45,785 || 1–0 || W1 
|- bgcolor=#bfb
| 2 || April 6 || Twins || 4–2 || Gallardo (1–0) || Gibson (0–1) || Britton (1) || 12,622 || 2–0 || W2 
|- bgcolor=#bfb
| 3 || April 7 || Twins || 4–2 || Jiménez (1–0) || Hughes (0–1) || O'Day (1) || 11,142 || 3–0 || W3
|- bgcolor=#bfb
| 4 || April 8 || Rays || 6–1 || Tillman (1–0) || Archer (0–2)  || — || 17,304 || 4–0 || W4
|- bgcolor=#bbb
| — || April 9 || Rays || colspan=7 | Postponed (rain). Makeup date June 25 as part of doubleheader.
|- bgcolor=#bfb
| 5 || April 10 || Rays || 5–3 || Brach (1–0) || Odorizzi (0–1) || Britton (2) || 23,101 || 5–0 || W5
|- bgcolor=#bfb
| 6 || April 11 || @ Red Sox || 9–7 || Brach (2–0) || Kimbrel (0–1) || Britton (3) || 37,160 || 6–0 || W6
|- bgcolor=#bfb
| 7 || April 12 || @ Red Sox || 9–5 ||Wright (1–0)  || Buchholz (0–1) || — || 31,114 || 7–0 || W7
|- bgcolor=#fbb
| 8 || April 13 || @ Red Sox || 2–4 || Kelly (1–0) || Jiménez (1–1) || Kimbrel (2) || 31,011 || 7–1 || L1
|- bgcolor=#fbb
| 9 || April 14 || @ Rangers || 3–6 || Wilhelmsen (1–0)  || Tillman (1–1)  || Tolleson (3) || 22,820 || 7–2 || L2
|- bgcolor=#bfb
| 10 ||  April 15 || @ Rangers || 11–5 || Worley (1–0) || Wilhelmsen (1–1) || — || 32,628 || 8–2 || W1
|- bgcolor=#fbb
| 11 || April 16 || @ Rangers || 4–8 || Kela (1–0) || McFarland (0–1) || — || 39,493 || 8–3 || L1 
|- bgcolor=#bbb
| — || April 17 || @ Rangers || colspan=7 | Postponed (rain). Makeup date June 20
|- bgcolor=#fbb
| 12 || April 19 || Blue Jays || 3–4 || Stroman (3–0) || Wright (1–1) || Osuna (5) || 16,783 || 8–4 || L2 
|- bgcolor=#bfb
| 13 || April 20 || Blue Jays || 4–3 (10) || Givens (1–0) || Biagini (0–1) || — || 15,404 || 9–4 || W1 
|- bgcolor=#bfb
| 14 || April 21 || Blue Jays || 3–2 || O'Day (1–0) || Cecil (0–3) || Britton (4) || 17,644 || 10–4 || W2 
|- bgcolor=#fbb
| 15 || April 22 || @ Royals || 2–4 || Young (1–3) || Gallardo (1–1) || Davis (7) || 29,546 || 10–5 || L1
|- bgcolor=#bfb
| 16 || April 23 || @ Royals || 8–3 || Wilson (1–0) || Medlen (1–1) || — || 39,900 || 11–5 || W1
|- bgcolor=#fbb
| 17 || April 24 || @ Royals || 1–6 || Ventura (2–0) || Wright (1–2) || — || 34,748 || 11–6 || L1
|- bgcolor=#fbb
| 18 || April 25 || @ Rays || 0–2 || Archer (1–4) || Gausman (0–1) || Colomé (4) || 12,996 || 11–7 || L2
|- bgcolor=#fbb
| 19 || April 26 || @ Rays || 1–3 || Romero (1–0) || Jiménez (1–2) || Colomé (5) || 10,988 || 11–8 || L3 
|- bgcolor=#bfb
| 20 || April 27 || @ Rays || 3–1 || Tillman (2–1) || Moore (1–2) || Britton (5) || 11,850 || 12–8 || W1
|- bgcolor=#bfb
| 21 || April 28 || White Sox || 10–2 || Givens (2–0)  || Danks (0–4)  || — || 14,568 || 13–8 || W2
|- bgcolor=#bfb
| 22 || April 29 || White Sox || 6–3 || Brach (3–0)  || Rodon (1–3) || Britton (6) || 19,912 || 14–8 ||W3
|- bgcolor=#fbb
| 23 || April 30 || White Sox || 7–8 || Jones (2–0)  || Britton (1–1)  || — || 29,152 || 14–9 || L1
|-

|- bgcolor=#fbb
| 24 || May 1|| White Sox || 1–7 || Sale (6–0) || Jiménez (1–3) || — || 28,803 || 14–10 || L2
|- bgcolor=#bfb
| 25 || May 3 || Yankees || 4–1 || Tillman (3–1) || Severino (0–4) || O'Day (2) || 16,083 || 15–10 || W1
|- bgcolor=#fbb
| 26 || May 4 || Yankees || 0–7 || Sabathia (2–2) || Wilson (1–1) || — || 15,998 || 15–11 || L1
|- bgcolor=#bfb
| 27 || May 5 || Yankees || 1–0 (10) || Britton (2–1) || Barbato (1–2) || — || 19,598 || 16–11 || W1
|- bgcolor=#bbb
| — || May 6 || Athletics || colspan=7| Postponed (rain). Makeup date May 7 as part of doubleheader.
|- bgcolor=#fbb
| 28 || May 7 || Athletics || 4–8 || Hill (4–3) || Wright (1–3) || — || 15,110 || 16–12 || L1
|- bgcolor=#bfb
| 29 || May 7 || Athletics || 5–2 || Jiménez (2–3) || Hahn (1–1) || Britton (7) || 29,862 || 17–12 || W1
|- bgcolor=#bfb
| 30 || May 8 || Athletics || 11–3 || Tillman (4–1) || Graveman (1–4) || — || 43,690 || 18–12 || W2
|- bgcolor=#bbb
| — || May 9 || @ Twins || colspan=7| Postponed (rain). Makeup date July 28.
|- bgcolor=#bfb
| 31 || May 10 || @ Twins || 5–3 || O'Day (2–0) || Jepsen (2–4) || Britton (8) || 21,586 || 19–12 || W3
|- bgcolor=#bfb
| 32 || May 11 || @ Twins || 9–2 || Wilson (2–1) || Hughes (1–6) || — || 25,094 || 20–12 || W4
|- bgcolor=#bfb
| 33 || May 12 || Tigers || 7–5 || Worley (2–0) || Wilson (0–1) || Britton (9) || 14,918 || 21–12 || W5
|- bgcolor=#bfb
| 34 || May 13 || Tigers || 1-0 ||  Tillman (5-1) ||  Verlander (2-4) || Britton (10) || 30,488 || 22–12 || W6
|- bgcolor=#bfb
| 35 || May 14 || Tigers || 9–3 || Wright (2–3) || Sánchez (3–4) || Brach (1) || 32,174 || 23–12 || W7
|- bgcolor=#fbb
| 36 || May 15 || Tigers || 5–6 || Saupold (1–0) || O'Day (2–1) || Rodríguez (9) || 37,890 || 23–13 || L1
|- bgcolor=#fbb
| 37 || May 17 || Mariners || 0–10 || Miley (4–2) || Jiménez (2–4) || — || 14,477 || 23–14 || L2
|- bgcolor=#bfb
| 38 || May 18 || Mariners || 5–2 || Tillman (6-1) || Walker (2–3) || Britton (11) || 21,267 || 24–14 || W1
|- bgcolor=#fbb
| 39 || May 19 || Mariners || 2–7 || Karns (4–1) || Wilson (2–2) || — || 35,012 || 24–15 || L1
|- bgcolor=#bfb
| 40 || May 20 || @ Angels || 9–4 || Givens (3–0) || Álvarez (1–2) || — || 40,987 || 25–15 || W1
|- bgcolor=#bfb
| 41 || May 21 || @ Angels || 3–1 || Brach (4–0) || Smith (1–3) || Britton (12) || 40,137 || 26–15 || W2
|- bgcolor=#fbb
| 42 || May 22 || @ Angels || 2–10 || Weaver (4–3) || Jiménez (2–5) || — || 41,280 || 26–16 || L1
|- bgcolor=#fbb
| 43 || May 24 || @ Astros || 2–3 (13) || Feliz (2–1) || Bundy (0–1) || — || 24,783 || 26–17 || L2
|- bgcolor=#fbb
| 44 || May 25 || @ Astros || 3–4 || Neshek (2–0) || Wilson (2–3) || Gregerson (10) || 25,618 || 26–18 || L3
|- bgcolor=#fbb
| 45 || May 26 || @ Astros || 2–4 || McCullers (1–1) || Gausman (0–2) || Giles (1) || 23,826 || 26–19 || L4
|- bgcolor=#bfb
| 46 || May 27 || @ Indians || 6–4 || Bundy (1–1) || McAllister (2–2) || Britton (13) || 21,054 || 27–19 || W1
|- bgcolor=#fbb
| 47 || May 28 || @ Indians || 4–11 || Salazar (5–3) || Jiménez (2–6) || — || 21,110 || 27–20 || L1
|- bgcolor=#bfb
| 48 || May 29 || @ Indians || 6–4 || Tillman (7–1) || Manship (0–1) || Britton (14) || 18,565 || 28–20 || W1
|- bgcolor=#fbb
| 49 || May 30 || Red Sox || 2–7 || Wright (5–4) || Willson (1–4) || — || 43,926 || 28–21 || L1
|- bgcolor=#fbb
| 50 || May 31 || Red Sox || 2–6 || Rodríguez (1–0) || Gausman (0–3) || — || 17,664 || 28–22 || L2
|-

|- bgcolor=#bfb
| 51 || June 1 || Red Sox || 13–9 || Brach (5–0) || Buchholz (3–6) || Britton (15) || 20,750 || 29–22 || W1
|- bgcolor=#bfb
| 52 || June 2 || Red Sox || 12–7 || Givens (4–0) || Ross (0–1) || — || 21,534 || 30–22 || W2
|- bgcolor=#bfb
| 53 || June 3 || Yankees || 6–5 || Givens (5–0) || Betances (2–3) || Britton (16) || 25,220 || 31–22 || W3
|- bgcolor=#fbb
| 54 || June 4 || Yankees || 6–8 || Nova (4–3) || Wilson (2–5) || Chapman (9) || 33,170 || 31–23 || L1
|- bgcolor=#bfb
| 55 || June 5 || Yankees || 3–1 || McFarland (1–1) || Betances (2–4) || Britton (17) || 28,807 || 32–23 || W1
|- bgcolor=#bfb
| 56 || June 6 || Royals || 4–1 || Wright (3–3) || Duffy (1–1) || Britton (18) || 14,878 || 33–23 || W2
|- bgcolor=#bfb
| 57 || June 7 || Royals || 9–1 || Jiménez (3–6) || Ventura (4–4) || — || 28,110 || 34–23 || W3
|- bgcolor=#bfb
| 58 || June 8 || Royals || 4–0 || Tillman (8–1) || Vólquez (5–6) || Brach (2) || 19,178 || 35–23 || W4
|- bgcolor=#bfb
| 59 || June 9 || @ Blue Jays || 6–5 || Bundy (2-1) || Osuna (2-1)  || Britton (19) || 41,448 || 36–23 || W5
|- bgcolor=#fbb
| 60 || June 10 || @ Blue Jays || 3–4 (10) || Storen (1-2) || Brach (5-1) || — || 44,439 || 36–24 || L1
|- bgcolor=#fbb
| 61 || June 11 || @ Blue Jays || 6–11 || Happ (7-3) || McFarland (1-2) || — || 47,651 || 36–25 || L2
|- bgcolor=#fbb
| 62 || June 12 || @ Blue Jays || 9–10 || Sanchez (6–1) || Jiménez (3–7) || Grilli (3) || 47,249 || 36–26 || L3
|- bgcolor=#bfb
| 63 || June 14 || @ Red Sox || 3–2 || Tillman (9–1) || Price (7–4) || Britton (20) || 38,009 || 37–26 || W1
|- bgcolor=#fbb
| 64 || June 15 || @ Red Sox || 4–6 || Wright (8–4) || Gausman (0–4) || Kimbrel (15) || 36,233 || 37–27 || L1
|- bgcolor=#bfb
| 65 || June 16 || @ Red Sox || 5–1 || Wilson (3–5) || Rodríguez (1–2) || — || 36,757 || 38–27 || W1
|- bgcolor=#fbb
| 66 || June 17 || Blue Jays || 3–13 || Happ (8–3) || Wright (3–4) || — || 38,306 || 38–28 || L1 
|- bgcolor=#bfb
| 67 || June 18 || Blue Jays || 4–2 || Gallardo (2–1) || Dickey (4–8) || Britton (21) || 41,901 || 39–28 || W1 
|- bgcolor=#bfb
| 68 || June 19 || Blue Jays || 11–6 || Tillman (10–1) || Stroman (6–3) || — || 39,024 || 40–28 || W2
|- bgcolor=#fbb
| 69 || June 20 || @ Rangers || 3–4 || Tolleson (2–2) || Gausman (0–5) || Dyson (14) || 35,366 || 40–29 || –L1
|- bgcolor=#fbb
| 70 || June 21 || Padres || 7–10 || Quackenbush (5–3) || Givens (5–1) || Rodney (15) || 23,876 || 40–30 || L2
|- bgcolor=#bfb
| 71 || June 22 || Padres || 7–2 || Jiménez (4–7) || Johnson (0–5) || — || 23,785 || 41–30 || W1
|- bgcolor=#bfb
| 72 || June 24 || Rays || 6–3 || Tolliver (1–0) || Moore (3–5) || Britton (22) || 44,956 || 42–30 || W2
|- bgcolor=#bfb
| 73 || June 25 || Rays || 5–0 || Gausman (1–5) || Andriese (6–1) || — || 18,229 || 43–40 || W3
|- bgcolor=#bfb
| 74 || June 25 || Rays || 8–6 || McFarland (2-2) || Ramírez (7–6) || Britton (23) || 33,040 || 44–30 || W4
|- bgcolor=#bfb
| 75 || June 26 || Rays || 12–5 || Wilson (4–5) || Smyly (2–8) ||  || 38,611 || 45–30 || W5
|- bgcolor=#bfb
| 76 || June 28 || @ Padres || 11–7 || Jiménez (5–7) || Johnson (0–6) || — || 31,515 || 46–30 || W6
|- bgcolor=#bfb
| 77 || June 29 || @ Padres || 12–6 || Gallardo (3–1) || Friedrich (4–3) || — || 25,221 || 47–30 || W7
|- bgcolor=#fbb
| 78 || June 30 || @ Mariners || 3–5 || Walker (4–6) || Tillman (10–2) || Cishek (19) || 23,715 || 47–31 || L1
|-

|- bgcolor=#fbb
| 79 || July 1 || @ Mariners || 2–5 || LeBlanc (1–0) || Gausman (1–6) || Cishek (20) || 33,006 || 47–32 || L2
|- bgcolor=#fbb
| 80 || July 2 || @ Mariners || 6–12 || Paxton (2–3) || Wilson (4–6) || Karns (1) || 29,362 || 47–33 || L3
|- bgcolor=#fbb
| 81 || July 3 || @ Mariners || 4–9 || Iwakuma (8–6) || Jiménez (5–8) || — || 31,405 || 47–34 || L4
|- bgcolor=#fbb
| 82 || July 4 || @ Dodgers || 5–7 || Blanton (4–2) || Despaigne (0–1) || Jansen (25) || 47,378 || 47–35 || L5
|- bgcolor=#bfb
| 83 || July 5 || @ Dodgers || 4–1 || Tilman (11–2) || Maeda (7–6) || Britton (24) || 45,373 || 48–35 || W1
|- bgcolor=#bfb
| 84 || July 6 || @ Dodgers || 6–4 (14) || Givens (6–1) || Hatcher (5–4) || Britton (25) || 40,899 || 49–35 || W2
|- bgcolor=#fbb
| 85 || July 8 || Angels || 5–9 || Shoemaker (4–9) || Jiménez (5–9) || — || 44,317 || 49–36 || L1
|- bgcolor=#bfb
| 86 || July 9 || Angels || 3–2 || Brach (6–1) || Smith (1–4) || Britton (26) || 43,288 || 50–36 || W1
|- bgcolor=#bfb
| 87 || July 10 || Angels || 4–2 || Tilman (12–2) || Lincecum (1–3) || Britton (27) || 32,963 || 51–36 || W2
|- bgcolor=#bbcaff
| ASG || July 12 || @ Petco Park || AL 4–2 NL || Kluber || Cueto || Britton || 42.386 || — || Box
|- bgcolor=#bfb
| 88 || July 15 || @ Rays || 4–3 || Givens (7–1) || Archer (4–13) || Britton (28) || 17,672 || 52–36 || W3
|- bgcolor=#bfb
| 89 || July 16 || @ Rays || 2–1 || Tillman (13–2) || Moore (5–7) || Britton (29) || 18,638 || 53–36 || W4
|- bgcolor=#fbb
| 90 || July 17 || @ Rays || 2–5 || Odorizzi (4–5) || Bundy (2–2) || Colomé (20) || 16,161 || 53–37 || L1
|- bgcolor=#fbb
| 91 || July 18 || @ Yankees || 1–2 || Nova (7–5) || Gausman (1–7) || Chapman (19) || 31,102 || 53–38 || L2
|- bgcolor=#fbb
| 92 || July 19 || @ Yankees || 1–7 || Eovaldi (8–6) || Worley (2–1) || — || 31,192 || 53–39 || L3
|- bgcolor=#fbb
| 93 || July 20 || @ Yankees || 0–5 || Pineda (4–9) || Gallardo (3–2) || — || 35,681 || 53–40 || L4
|- bgcolor=#bfb
| 94 || July 21 || @ Yankees || 4–1 || Tillman (14–2) || Sabathia (5–8) || Britton (30) || 42,476 || 54–40 || W1
|- bgcolor=#bfb
| 95 || July 22 || Indians || 5–1 || Bundy (3–2) || Bauer (7–4) || Britton (31) || 39,358 || 55–40 || W2
|- bgcolor=#bfb
| 96 || July 23 || Indians || 5–2 || Gausman (2–7) || Tomlin (10–3) || Britton (32) || 31,946 || 56–40 || W3
|- bgcolor=#bfb
| 97 || July 24 || Indians || 5–3 || O'Day (3–1) || Allen (2–4) || — || 37,821 || 57–40 || W4
|- bgcolor=#bfb
| 98 || July 25 || Rockies || 3–2 (10) || Roe (1–0) || Lyles (2–3) || — || 19,361 || 58–40 || W5
|- bgcolor=#fbb
| 99 || July 26 || Rockies|| 3–6 || Bettis (9–6) || Tillman (14–3) || Estévez (9) || 23,677 || 58–41 || L1
|- bgcolor=#fbb
| 100 || July 27 || Rockies || 1–3 || Gray (7–4) || Bundy (3–3) || Estévez (10) || 20,324 || 58–42 || L2
|- bgcolor=#fbb
| 101 || July 28 || @ Twins || 2-6 || Pressly (5–5) || Despaigne (0–2) || — || 22,569 || 58–43 || L3
|- bgcolor=#fbb
| 102 || July 29 || @ Blue Jays || 5-6 || Estrada (6–4) || Gausman (2–8) || Osuna (21) || 46,112 || 58–44 || L4
|- bgcolor=#fbb
| 103 || July 30 || @ Blue Jays || 1–9 || Happ (14-3) || Gallardo (3–3) || — || 47,305 || 58–45 || L5
|- bgcolor=#bfb
| 104 || July 31 || @ Blue Jays || 6–2 (12) || Givens (8–1) || Morales (0–1) || — || 46,792 || 59–45 || W1
|-

|- bgcolor=#bfb
| 105 || August 2 || Rangers || 5–1 || Bundy (4–3) || Darvish (2–3) || O'Day (3) || 22,230 || 60–45 || W2
|- bgcolor=#bfb
| 106 || August 3 || Rangers || 3–2 || Gausman (3–8) || Hamels (12–3) || Britton (33) || 24,552 || 61–45 || W3
|- bgcolor=#fbb
| 107 || August 4 || Rangers || 3–5 || Griffin (5–1) || Miley (7–9) || Dyson (23) || 28,762 || 61–46 || L1
|- bgcolor=#bfb
| 108 || August 5 || @ White Sox || 7–5 || Gallardo  (4–3) || González (2–6) || Britton (34) || 26,553 || 62–46 || W1
|- bgcolor=#fbb
| 109 || August 6 || @ White Sox || 2–4 || Jones (5–2) || Tillman (14–4) || Robertson (27) || 28,491 || 62–47 || L1
|- bgcolor=#bfb
| 110 || August 7 || @ White Sox || 10–2 || Bundy (5–3) || Shields (5–14) || — || 31,040 || 63–47 || W1
|- bgcolor=#fbb
| 111 || August 8 || @ Athletics || 2–3 || Graveman (8–7) || Gausman (3–9) || Madson (23) || 10,407 || 63–48 || L1
|- bgcolor=#fbb
| 112 || August 9 || @ Athletics || 1–2 || Neal (2–1) || Miley (7–10) || Madson (24) || 13,573 || 63–49 || L2
|- bgcolor=#fbb
| 113 || August 10 || @ Athletics || 0–1 || Detwiler (1–0) || Gallardo  (4–4) || Axford (2) || 13,481 || 63–50 || L3
|- bgcolor=#bfb
| 114 || August 11 || @ Athletics || 9–6 || Tillman (15–4) || Triggs (1–0) || Britton (35) || 16,610 || 64–50 || W1
|- bgcolor=#bfb
| 115 || August 12 || @ Giants || 5–2 || Bundy (6–3) || Cain (4–7) || Britton (36) || 41,479 || 65–50 || W2
|- bgcolor=#fbb
| 116 || August 13 || @ Giants || 2–6 || Bumgarner (11–7) || Gausman  (3–10) || Casilla (27) || 41,456 || 65–51 || L1
|- bgcolor=#bfb
| 117 || August 14 || @ Giants || 8–7 || Brach (7–1) || Casilla (2–4) || Britton (37) || 41,268 || 66–51 || W1
|- bgcolor=#fbb
| 118 || August 16 || Red Sox || 3–5 || Ziegler (3–6) || Brach (7–2) || Kimbrel (21) || 26,014 || 66–52 || L1
|- bgcolor=#fbb
| 119 || August 17 || Red Sox || 1–8 (7) || Price (11–8) || Bundy (6–4) || — || 26,160 || 66–53 || L2
|- bgcolor=#bfb
| 120 || August 18 || Astros || 13–5 || Gausman (4–10) || Musgrove (1–1) || — || 20,288 || 67–53 || W1
|- bgcolor=#fbb
| 121 || August 19 || Astros || 8–15 || Devenski (2–4) || Jiménez (5–10) || — || 34,422 || 67–54 || L1
|- bgcolor=#fbb
| 122 || August 20 || Astros || 2–12 || Fiers (9–6) || Tillman (15–5) || — || 39,373 || 67–55 || L2
|- bgcolor=#fbb
| 123 || August 21 || Astros || 3–5 || Keuchel (8-12) || Gallardo (4-5) || Giles (3) || 29,734 || 67-56 || L3
|- bgcolor=#bfb
| 124 || August 22 || Nationals || 4–3 || Bundy (7–4) || Cole (0–1) || Britton (38) || 31,660 || 68–56 || W1
|- bgcolor=#bfb
| 125 || August 23 || Nationals || 8–1 || Gausman (5–10) || López (2–2) || Worley (1) || 26,697 || 69–56 || W2
|- bgcolor=#bfb
| 126 || August 24 || @ Nationals || 10–8 || Miley (8–10) || Roark (13–7) || — || 39,100 || 70–56 || W3
|- bgcolor=#fbb
| 127 || August 25 || @ Nationals || 0–4 || Scherzer (14–7) || Jiménez (5–11) || — || 39,722 || 70–57 || L1
|- bgcolor=#fbb
| 128 || August 26 || @ Yankees || 4–14 || Cessa (4–0) || Gallardo (4–6) || — || 38,423 || 70–58 || L2
|- bgcolor=#fbb
| 129 || August 27 || @ Yankees || 5–13 || Layne (1–1) || Bundy (7–5) || — || 38,843 || 70–59 || L3
|- bgcolor=#bfb
| 130 || August 28 || @ Yankees || 5–0 || Gausman (6–10) || Sabathia (8–11) || — || 38,002 || 71–59 || W1
|- bgcolor=#fbb
| 131 || August 29 || Blue Jays || 1–5 || Estrada (8–6) || Miley (8–11) || — || 15,532 || 71–60 || L1
|- bgcolor=#bfb
| 132 || August 30 || Blue Jays || 5–3 || Brach (8–2) || Grilli (5–4) || Britton (39) || 16,083 || 72–60 || W1
|- bgcolor=#fbb
| 133 || August 31 || Blue Jays || 3–5 || Sanchez (13–2) || Gallardo (4–7) || — || 16,161 || 72–61 || L1
|-

|- bgcolor=#bfb
| 134 || September 2 || Yankees || 8–0 || Bundy (8–5) || Green (2–4) || — || 24,226 || 73–61 || W1
|- bgcolor=#bfb
| 135 || September 3 || Yankees || 2–0 || Gausman (7–10) || Sabathia (8–12) || Britton (40) || 30,855 || 74–61 || W2
|- bgcolor=#fbb
| 136 || September 4 || Yankees || 2–5 || Severino (2–8) || Miley (8–12) || Betances (8)|| 31,161 || 74–62 || L1
|- bgcolor=#bfb
| 137 || September 5 || @ Rays || 7–3 || Jimenez (6–11) || Andriese (6–7) || — || 12,256 || 75–62 || W1
|- bgcolor=#bfb
| 138 || September 6 || @ Rays || 11–2 || Gallardo (5–7) || Odorizzi (9–6) || — || 12,207 || 76–62 || W2
|- bgcolor=#fbb
| 139 || September 7 || @ Rays || 7–6 || Boxberger (3–0) || Givens (8–2) || Colomé (31) || 10,537 || 76–63 || L1
|- bgcolor=#fbb
| 140 || September 9 || @ Tigers || 3–4 || Wilson (3–0) || Brach (8–3) || Rodríguez (40) || 32,140 || 76–64 || L2
|- bgcolor=#bfb
| 141 || September 10 || @ Tigers || 11–3 || Jiménez (7–11) || Zimmermann (9–6) || — ||  || 77–64 ||W1
|- bgcolor=#bfb
| 142 || September 11 || @ Tigers || 3–1 || Tillman (16–5) || Verlander (14–8) || Britton (41) || 33,069 || 78–64 || W2
|- bgcolor=#fbb
| 143 || September 12 || @ Red Sox || 2–12 || Price (16–8) || Miley (8–13) || — || 37,551 || 78–65 || L1
|- bgcolor=#bfb
| 144 || September 13 || @ Red Sox || 6–3 || Bundy (9–5) || Pomeranz (10–12) || Britton (42) || 38,041 || 79–65 || W1
|- bgcolor=#bfb
| 145 || September 14 || @ Red Sox || 1–0 || Gausman (8–10) || Porcello (20–4) || Britton (43) || 37,973 || 80–65 || W2
|- bgcolor=#fbb
| 146 || September 15 || Rays || 6–7 || Snell (6–8) || Gallardo (5–8) || Colomé (33) || 19,233 || 80–66 || L1
|- bgcolor=#bfb
| 147 || September 16 || Rays || 5–4 || Brach (9–3) || Boxberger (4–2) || Britton (44) || 30,094 || 81–66 || W1
|- bgcolor=#fbb
| 148 || September 17 || Rays || 2–5 || Andriese (8–7) || Tillman (16–6) || Colomé (34) || 27,823 || 81–67 || L1
|- bgcolor=#bfb
| 149 || September 18 || Rays || 2–1 || Brach (10–3) || Garton (1–1) || Britton (45) || 28,427 || 82–67 || W1
|- bgcolor=#fbb
| 150 || September 19 || Red Sox || 2–5 || Porcello (21–4) || Bundy (9–6) || — || 18,456 || 82–68 || L1
|- bgcolor=#fbb
| 151 || September 20 || Red Sox || 2–5 || Rodríguez (3–7) || Gausman (8–11) || Kimbrel (28) || 20,387 || 82–69 || L2
|- bgcolor=#fbb
| 152 || September 21 || Red Sox || 1–5 || Buchholz (8–10) || Jiménez (7–12) || — || 20,865 || 82–70 || L3
|- bgcolor=#fbb
| 153|| September 22 || Red Sox || 3–5 || Price (17–8) || Worley (2–2) || Kimbrel (29) || 26,788 || 82–71 || L4
|- bgcolor=#bfb
| 154 || September 23 || Diamondbacks || 3–2 (12) || Drake  (1–0) || Koch (1–1) || — || 37,815 || 83–71 || W1
|- bgcolor=#bfb
| 155 || September 24 || Diamondbacks || 6–1 || Miley (9–13) || Ray (8–14) || — || 40,610 || 84–71 || W2
|- bgcolor=#bfb
| 156 || September 25 || Diamondbacks || 2–1 || Bundy (10–6) || Shipley (4–5) || Britton (46) || 31,229 || 85–71 || W3
|- bgcolor=#fbb
| 157 || September 27 || @ Blue Jays || 1–5 || Sanchez (14–2) || Gausman (8–12) || — || 44,762 || 85–72 || L1
|- bgcolor=#bfb
| 158 || September 28 || @ Blue Jays || 3–2 || Duensing (1–0) || Osuna (3–3) || Britton (47) || 44,668 || 86–72 || W1
|- bgcolor=#bfb
| 159 || September 29 || @ Blue Jays || 4–0 || Jiménez (8–12) || Stroman (9–10) || — || 47,791 || 87–72 || W2
|- bgcolor=#bfb
| 160 || September 30 || @ Yankees || 8–1 || Gallardo (6–8) || Pineda (6–12) || — || 33,955 || 88–72 || W3
|- bgcolor=#fbb
| 161 || October 1 || @ Yankees || 3–7 || Clippard (4–6) || Brach (10–4) || — || 33,222 || 88–73 || L1
|- style="text-align:center; background-color:#003399; color:white"
| 162 || October 2 || @ Yankees || 5–2 || Gausman (9–12) || Cessa (4–4)  || — || 33,277 || 89–73 || W1
|-

Post-season

Wild Card Game

The Orioles faced the Toronto Blue Jays in the Wild Card Game, losing 5–2 in 11 innings.

Post-season Game Log

|- bgcolor=#fbb
| October 4 || @ Blue Jays || 2–5 (11) || Liriano (1–0) || Jiménez (0–1) || — || 49,934 || 0–1 ||
|-

Postseason rosters

| style="text-align:left" |
Pitchers: 29 Tommy Hunter 30 Chris Tillman 31 Ubaldo Jiménez 35 Brad Brach 37 Dylan Bundy 50 Brian Duensing 53 Zach Britton 56 Darren O'Day 58 Donnie Hart 60 Mychal Givens
Catchers: 32 Matt Wieters 36 Caleb Joseph 
Infielders: 2 J. J. Hardy 3 Ryan Flaherty 6 Jonathan Schoop 13 Manny Machado 19 Chris Davis 24 Pedro Álvarez 67 Trey Mancini 
Outfielders: 1 Michael Bourn 10 Adam Jones 14 Nolan Reimold 18 Drew Stubbs 25 Hyun-soo Kim 45 Mark Trumbo 
|- valign="top"

Accolades
Mark Trumbo: AL Co-Player of the Week (Week of April 17)
Manny Machado: AL Player of the Month (April).
Chris Davis: Al Player of the Week (Week of June 12)
Mark Trumbo: 
AL Sporting News Comeback Player of the Year Award
AL Silver Slugger Award – DH
Zach Britton: Mariano Rivera Award

All-Star Game
The following Orioles were selected to participate in the 2016 Major League Baseball All-Star Game:
Brad Brach (1st)
Zach Britton (2nd)
Manny Machado (3rd)
Mark Trumbo (2nd)
Matt Wieters (4th)

Roster

Team leaders

Source

Farm system

References

External links

2016 Baltimore Orioles season at Official site 
2016 Baltimore Orioles season at Baseball Reference

Baltimore Orioles seasons
Baltimore Orioles
Baltimore Orioles